The chapters of the manga series Fushigi Yûgi were written and illustrated by Yuu Watase. The first chapter premiered in the January 1, 1992 ( 1) issue of Shōjo Comic, released in December 1991. The series concluded in the June 5, 1996 ( 12) issue, released in May 1996. Fushigi Yûgi tells the story of two teenage girls, Miaka and Yui, who are pulled into The Universe of the Four Gods, a mysterious book they find at the National Diet Library. In the book world, they are each priestesses of separate beast gods, with jealousy and tragedy turning the best friends against one another. A prequel series, Fushigi Yûgi: Genbu Kaiden, appeared in Shōjo Comic Zōkan in 2003 before moving to an offshoot magazine called Perfect World Fushigi Yûgi in 2004. When Perfect World folded in 2008, the manga was placed on hiatus for two years, resuming serialization in Rinka in 2010. It moved once again to Zōkan Flowers in 2012, ending in 2013. Genbu Kaiden details the creation of The Universe of the Four Gods and tells the full story of the Priestess of Genbu, who is only briefly mentioned in the original series. Following Genbu Kaiden, a one-shot chapter, Fushigi Yûgi: Byakko Ibun, was published in Monthly Flowers in February 2015. It served as an introduction to another prequel series, Fushigi Yûgi: Byakko Senki, which began serialization in Monthly Flowers in August 2017, but was placed on hiatus in August 2018 due to Watase's health issues. Byakko Senki will be the final installment in the "Four Gods" storyline.

The 106 individual chapters of Fushigi Yûgi were collected and published in eighteen tankōbon volumes by Shogakukan starting in May 1992; the last volume was released in July 1996. Shogakukan collected the chapters of Fushigi Yûgi: Genbu Kaiden into twelve tankōbon volumes published from October 2003 to May 2013, and the chapters of Fushigi Yûgi: Byakko Senki into one tankōbon volume as of April 2018.

Fushigi Yûgi and its prequel series, Fushigi Yûgi: Genbu Kaiden and Fushigi Yûgi: Byakko Senki, are all licensed for English-language releases in North America by Viz Media. Viz serialized Fushigi Yûgi in their manga anthology magazine, Animerica Extra, starting with the October 1998 debut issue and running until the magazine's final issue in December 2004. The series was first released in a flipped trade paperback format, starting in August 1998. Viz kept the original Chinese names of characters and places, at the request of Watase, causing some confusion for fans as the anime version uses the Japanese names. After eight volumes, Viz put the release on hiatus, later reviving it in June 2003 with a re-release of the series in unflipped standard manga size volumes and printing volumes nine through eighteen. The final volume was released in April 2006. In the table below, the dates and ISBN numbers given for the first eight volumes are for the second edition releases. In January 2009, Viz again began re-releasing the series, this time as part of their "VIZBIG" line of manga, which include three of the original volumes into a single, larger volume with extra color pages. The first volume of Genbu Kaiden was released in English in July 2005; the twelfth and final volume was released in March 2014. Viz released the first volume of Byakko Senki in August 2020.

Volume list

Fushigi Yûgi

Fushigi Yûgi: Genbu Kaiden

Fushigi Yûgi: Byakko Senki

References

External links
 Official Viz Media Fushigi Yûgi website
 
 
 

Fushigi Yûgi